The 2013 Atlantic Coast Conference men's soccer tournament was the 27th edition of the ACC Men's Soccer Tournament. The tournament decided the Atlantic Coast Conference champion and guaranteed representative into the 2013 NCAA Division I Men's Soccer Championship. Held at the Maryland SoccerPlex, the Maryland Terrapins, the defending champions, successfully defended their title against their rivals, the Virginia Cavaliers, 1–0 in the final.

Qualification 

For the first time since 2001, not every ACC team earned a berth into the tournament. Instead, the top eight teams in the conference based on their conference record earned qualification into the tournament.  Ignore the Bracket and Schedule that follows as they are from the 2012 tournament, not 2013.

Bracket

Schedule

Play-in round

Quarterfinals

Semifinals

ACC Championship

Statistical leaders

See also 
 Atlantic Coast Conference
 2013 Atlantic Coast Conference men's soccer season
 2013 NCAA Division I men's soccer season
 2013 NCAA Division I Men's Soccer Championship

References 

ACC Men's Soccer Tournament
Tournament
ACC Men's Soccer Tournament
ACC Men's Soccer Tournament